Kim Ung ( or  ; 1912 – ?) was a North Korean general and vice-minister of defence.  He was a member of the Yan'an faction.

Chinese military
Kim fled China to avoid the Japanese occupation, and was trained at the Whampoa Military Academy in the late 1920s or early 1930s.  He became a communist and probably was on the Long March.  During the late 1930s and the 1940s he was in the Eighth Route Army and became brigadier or divisional commander.

Korean war
On the outbreak of war, 25 June 1950, Kim was a lieutenant general commanding 1 Corps of the Korean People's Army (KPA).  On the death in action of Lieutenant General Kang Kon, Kim succeeded him as chief of staff to General Kim Chaek, front commander.

By 1951 Kim Ung was KPA front commander, succeeding Kim Chaek, who was purged for his failure at the Incheon Landing, Kim Ung held the post until the end of the war.

Post war
After the war Kim Ung was appointed vice Defence Minister of North Korea. In 1958 he was purged by Kim Il-sung, rehabilitated and purged again in 1978.

References

1912 births
Date of birth missing
Year of death unknown
Place of death missing
Korean expatriates in China
Ambassadors of North Korea
North Korean politicians
North Korean generals
Korean independence activists
People from North Gyeongsang Province
Republic of China Military Academy alumni
Purges in North Korea
North Korean military personnel of the Korean War